Filipeni is a village in Leova District, Moldova.

References

Villages of Leova District